Nenad Studen (Serbian Cyrillic: Ненад Студен, born 4 February 1979) is a Bosnian professional football manager and former player.

Playing career
Studen started his career in hometown club, Borac Banja Luka in 1999. In 2000, he was signed by Serbian giants Partizan and came as a great talent. Fighting to get a place in the team, he was loaned to Partizan's satellite club Teleoptik for two seasons. In 2002, Studen returned to Borac, and after a year, he transferred to Rudar Ugljevik. In January 2005, he signed with Polish club Wisła Płock. Then, Studen played for one season ar Radomiak Radom before returning to Bosnia, joining Kozara Gradiška.

In 2007, he signed a contract with Laktaši. Studen started the 2008–09 season playing with Laktaši in the Bosnian Premier League, but he went back to Kozara where he played the first half of the season, while on the winter break he moved to Sloga Trn, playing in the First League of RS at the time. In the summer of 2009, Studen again came back to Kozara. In the 2010–11 season, he with Kozara got promoted back to the Bosnian Premier League, but got relegated immediately back to the First League of RS in the 2011–12 Bosnian Premier League season.

In July 2012, he signed with Krupa, playing for the club until July 2015, after which he retired from playing football at the age of 37.

Managerial career
In 2019, Studen became the new assistant manager at Krupa, previously working as a coach in the youth team of the club.

Honours

Player
Kozara Gradiška
First League of RS: 2010–11

Krupa
Second League of RS: 2013–14 (West)

References

External links

1979 births
Living people
Sportspeople from Banja Luka
Serbs of Bosnia and Herzegovina
Bosnia and Herzegovina footballers
Bosnia and Herzegovina expatriate footballers
Expatriate footballers in Serbia and Montenegro
Expatriate footballers in Poland
Bosnia and Herzegovina expatriate sportspeople in Serbia and Montenegro
Bosnia and Herzegovina expatriate sportspeople in Poland
First League of the Republika Srpska players
Second League of Serbia and Montenegro players
Premier League of Bosnia and Herzegovina players
Ekstraklasa players
FK Borac Banja Luka players
FK Partizan players
FK Teleoptik players
FK Kozara Gradiška players
FK Rudar Ugljevik players
Wisła Płock players
Radomiak Radom players
FK Laktaši players
FK Krupa players
Association football midfielders
Bosnia and Herzegovina football managers